Jesse Benjamin Brown is a Canadian journalist, media personality, and businessperson. In 2013, he founded the Canadaland podcast that grew into a podcasting company.

Brown's 2014 investigative reports with Kevin Donovan, published by the Toronto Star, focussed on various women who claimed to have endured non-consensual violent conduct and workplace sexual harassment from Canadian radio and television personality Jian Ghomeshi. Ghomeshi was later acquitted of all charges at his trial.

Early life
Born to a Canadian Jewish family and raised in Toronto, Brown attended Northern Secondary School. He got his first experience with the media at the age of sixteen, interning at local radio station Q107's promotions department through his high school's co-op program.

At seventeen, inspired by punk zines and "too many" viewings of Pump Up the Volume, Brown started Punch, an underground student newspaper that raised a commotion by running a piece evaluating the school's teachers based on a survey of hundred students Brown interviewed. He ended up getting disciplined by the school's principal while the entire episode raised enough controversy to be featured on Metro Morning, a CBLA-FM radio programme then-hosted by Andy Barrie, where young Brown got invited to give his side of the story. Based on the publicity it received via the controversy, the paper expanded to become a Toronto-wide underground project that ran for a few years.

Education and freelance work 
During mid-to-late 1990s, Brown moved to Montreal to attend McGill University where he studied English. Outside of classes, he freelanced for various outlets including Vice, a magazine that recently transformed from a government-funded Voice of Montreal community multicultural media project. He also engaged in elaborate pranks on local mainstream media organizations such as putting out a press-release from a fictitious dot-com company babytalk.com about a fictitious product, Babytalk, that "empowers Canadian infants to communicate with Japanese, Australian, and German tots" and helps them "make friends all over the world and learn valuable job skills sure to aid them in the new-economy job market". CFCF, CTV's affiliate in Montreal, shot a piece on the fake product by the non-existent company featuring a woman with her 2-year-old baby (both arranged for by Brown) that aired on the station's 6 p.m. daily newscast.

Media career
Between 2003 and 2004, Brown wrote a humour column in the Saturday Night magazine in Toronto. Simultaneously, he continued setting up pranks that served as fodder for the column. In 2003, using a pseudonym Stuart Neihardt, Brown staged a media hoax that several Canadian publications fell for and reported on as news by publicizing the launch of Stu, a "regular guy magazine for the adequate man" envisioned as an antidote to then popular lad magazines such as FHM and Maxim.

CBC Radio
Brown joined CBC Radio in 2004 as a chase producer, gathering stories, booking guests, and preparing material for various programs. He got hired to the network by Michael Enright who felt the young man's humour and irreverence would be a welcome addition to CBC Radio's creative process.

In summer 2006, Brown started hosting The Contrarians, a 30-minute weekly show on CBC Radio One devoted to discussion of unpopular ideas in the Canadian context "that just might be right". It consisted of Brown championing a controversial argument each episode to see if it had merit. The topics covered included a thesis that "multiculturalism doesn't work, we just eat each other's sandwiches", a claim that feminism had basically achieved all its goals, a rejection of the widely held view that Canada is a 'good guy' on the global scene, etc. It aired Tuesdays at 9:30 a.m. with a repeat the following day at 7:30 pm. The show ended once the new season began in the fall.

Search Engine
Together with Geoff Siskind and Andrew Parker, Brown created Search Engine, a weekly 30-minute radio program that started airing on CBC Radio One in September 2007. Hosted by Brown and airing Thursdays at 11:30 am, the show explored the effects of the Internet on politics and culture while fostering a bit of a collaborative community through its online blog.

CBC cancelled Search Engine in June 2008 as a separate program on its radio schedule, leading to the show's reformatting into a podcast distributed by the CBC while Brown additionally started contributing tech-related material as a feature supplement to other CBC Radio shows such as Metro Morning, The Point, and The Sunday Edition. By spring 2009, in the wake of the corporation's budget cuts, CBC Radio fully terminated its association with Search Engine.

The podcast continued, however, from May 2009, now distributed online by TVOntario, a broadcast network owned by the Government of Ontario. After 177 podcasts on TVO.org, Search Engine ended in July 2012.

Macleans.ca, Toronto Life, and journalism 
In February 2011, Brown began a tech blog on the Maclean's web site. Focusing on the influence of technology on politics and culture rather than merely on presenting the latest gadgets, he documented and opined on issues around WikiLeaks, Stop Online Piracy Act (SOPA), CSEC unwarranted spying of Canadians, cyber-bullying, etc.

None of Brown's online writings in his two and a half years at Maclean's made the then weekly magazine's print issue.

In early 2018, Brown wrote a scathing op-ed in The New York Times about University of Toronto psychology professor and author Jordan Peterson.

Canadaland

Having had four of his pitches based around substantive critique of journalism in Canada rejected by different Canadian mainstream news organizations, Brown launched his own media criticism podcast and blog called Canadaland in October 2013. Posted on a weekly basis, it got off the ground with sponsorship from FreshBooks, an accounting software service based in Toronto. In May 2014, the Freshbooks sponsorship expired and didn't get renewed, forcing Brown into finding a new sponsor, Audible.com, which pulled out by September and got replaced with Squarespace. However, facing a situation where existing ad revenue couldn't cover the costs anymore, Brown sought additional ad sources. In early October 2014, he announced a crowdfunding initiative through Patreon, seeking funds to keep Canadaland afloat, admitting that everything about it works except the financing while also revealing that the podcast attracts some 10,000 listeners every week.

Following the Ghomeshi story, Canadaland continued to grow in popularity, gaining crowdfunded financial support through Patreon. Brown expanded adding new podcasts, Canadaland Commons, focused on Canadian politics and The Imposter focused on Canada's art scene, which is no longer produced.

Canadaland podcasts were downloaded over 9 million times in 2020, making it one of the most popular podcasts in Canada.

Business career
In parallel with journalism, Brown established an IT startup. In 2007, together with a high school friend, cartoonist Jacob Blackstock, he co-founded Bitstrips, a company that developed Bitmoji web app allowing users to create animated avatars of themselves. By late 2012, the application expanded to Facebook and additionally to mobile platforms during fall 2013.

Brown continued as the Bitstrips' co-owner and in November 2013 the company attracted a $3 million investment from Horizons Ventures, a venture capital firm owned by Sir Li Ka-shing. In October 2014, the company announced new $8 million funding from Kleiner Perkins Caufield & Byers. After it became available on iOS and Android, the application found immediate success in the Apple App Store, reportedly ranking consistently in the top 10 utility apps.

He is reportedly worth millions of dollars, as a result of the sale of Bitstrips to Snapchat for $US 100 million. Brown has never publicly disclosed his share of profits from the sale.

Reception 
In Secret Life: The Jian Ghomeshi Investigation, Kevin Donovan, an investigative reporter who worked with Brown on the Ghomeshi story, credits Brown for some of the investigation, but encountered some serious culture-clashes with him; Donovan objected to Brown's habit of finishing interviewee's sentences and said that he was "reluctant to ask his sources tough questions."

In a piece in NOW Magazine, Vidya Kauri said that Brown had broken important stories, but that he was "...too quick to publish things that seem to be based on rumors or the bitter feelings of (ex-) employees with an agenda."

Brown has been criticized by Simon Houpt in The Globe and Mail, who said that Brown had defended controversial right-wing Canadian media personality Ezra Levant on a story about Ontario's Greater Essex County District School Board by claiming the school board had doctored a document, and that this proved to be false. Houpt also quoted a Montreal Gazette blog stating that "Canadaland has a habit of sensationalizing and editorializing".

In blog post published by the Huffington Post, Jesse Ferreras described Brown as a "mistake-prone media critic who is perilously short on self-reflection."

In 2021, in the context of the release of The White Saviors podcast, Mike Cohen described Brown as Justin Trudeau’s worst nightmare.

Personal
Brown is married to Katie Minsky and has two children.

References

External links
Canadaland podcast

Canadian magazine journalists
Canadian radio journalists
CBC Radio hosts
Jewish Canadian journalists
Journalists from Toronto
Living people
Canadian podcasters
McGill University alumni
Maclean's writers and editors
Criticism of journalism
Year of birth missing (living people)